Heringia latitarsis is a European species of hoverfly.

References

Diptera of Europe
Pipizinae
Insects described in 1865
Taxa named by Johann Egger